Leonard Nangolo Auala (25 September 1908, Iiyale, Oniipa, Ovamboland, German South West Africa – 4 December, 1983, Onandjokwe, South West Africa) was a Namibian Lutheran Church leader.

Early life
Auala was born in Oniipa, Ovamboland, German South West Africa. He was the son of Nakanyala Vilho yaAwala (Shihwa) waAmukwiyu and Nekwaya Loide yaShikongo shaNangolo dhaAmutenya.

Auala was raised partly by Lutheran missionaries from Finland. He went to primary school in Oniipa between 1919 and 1929, and between 1929 and 1931 he attended the local teacher training seminary there. During 1934–35, he studied at Augustineum, Okahandja, during 1934–35, and he received theological training in  Elim in 1942, when he was ordained a pastor. He received further theological training at the Moravian Theological Seminary in Port Elizabeth, South Africa, during 1956–57.

Career
Auala was consecrated a bishop in 1963 by visiting Bishop Eelis Gulin from Tampere, Finland, in connection of the Church General Synod.

Auala was the first Namibian bishop of the Evangelical Lutheran Church in Namibia (ELCIN), a member of the Lutheran World Federation. He lived most of his life under South African rule. As a prominent religious leader for both the Ovambo people and other groups across Namibia, Auala met regularly with the South Africans to discuss issues like contract labour and other facets of apartheid. A member of the South West Africa People's Organization, he received threats and harassment from the South African occupiers.

Personal life
Auala was married to Aina Aluhe yaSakeus from 1935 on. They had 10 children, six sons and four daughters.

References

1908 births
1983 deaths
People from Oshikoto Region
Namibian Lutheran clergy
20th-century Lutheran bishops
Ovambo people
Members of SWAPO
Lutheran bishops in Africa
Augustineum Secondary School alumni